Greta Thunberg: A Year to Change the World is a three-part documentary series following the climate change activist Greta Thunberg from August 2019 to late 2020, when she was aged 16–17. She travels North America and Europe, hearing experts talk about the complex and diverse effects climate change has had, including damage to forests, the retreat of glaciers, ocean acidification and flash flooding. The series also explores methods to combat climate change such as carbon capture and helping wetlands and mangroves to flourish, but finds that such solutions cannot be rolled out fast enough to be the only part of a climate change mitigation plan. Additionally, Thunberg speaks at conferences, meets the natural historian David Attenborough and attends climate strikes. Plans for filming in other parts of the world were abandoned when the COVID-19 pandemic restricted travel from March 2020 onwards.

Production
Thunberg said that the motivation for the project was "to give science a voice and to really go more in depth". She wanted viewers not to "say, 'Oh, that's nice,' and just go on like before", but for it to make "a lasting impact". The series takes place in North America and Europe. Plans for journeying to the Global South and to East Asia—in particular to China, via Trans-Siberian Railway—were thwarted by the COVID-19 pandemic. Thunberg estimated that they had over 100 days of filming planned and that only a quarter was achieved. When she returned to Stockholm at the start of the pandemic, she and her father were ill. Her father found that he had COVID-19, but Thunberg could not take a test as she was underage.

Thunberg said in April 2021 that she hoped to later visit countries including China, Japan and South Korea which she had planned to for the documentary. She also said that all of the fashion, car, oil and air travel companies they asked for interviews declined.

Academic consultants for the series included professors at the Open University: Emma Dewberry, a Design for Sustainability lecturer; David Humphreys, an Environmental Policy professor; and Neil Edwards, an Earth System Science professor.

BBC Studios announced production of the series in February 2020.

Release
In February 2021 it was announced that it would air on the BBC One in the United Kingdom and on PBS in the United States. In the U.K., the first episode premiered on 12 April in the Monday 9p.m. timeslot. In the U.S., to celebrate Earth Day, the three episodes aired consecutively on 22 April from 8 to 11p.m. The series was released on the streaming platform Hulu on the same day. In Australia, the series was aired weekly beginning 26 April on ABC Television and was made available on its streaming platform, iview. The series is available for free streaming from the Norwegian broadcaster NRK starting 24 August 2021, with subtitles in Norwegian.

Episodes

Reception
Emily Baker rated the series five out of five stars in i, praising the approachability of the scientific information, and that the documentary's focus on such content was "living up to its subjects wishes". Baker found Thunberg's "quiet rage" to be "inspiring" and "validated by scientists at every turn", while praising the "moments of intimacy" between Thunberg and her father. In a four star review, The Independents Sean O'Grady found the series "predictable, but still awesome". O'Grady praised "breathtaking and depressing" scenery in the Rocky Mountains and Thunberg's "self-possessed" nature, finding the piece "a monument to our new religion of environmentalism". Suzi Feay of the Financial Times rated the first episode four stars. Chris Bennion of The Telegraph gave it three stars, saying that Thunberg was "right about climate change" but that the most emotional content is Thunberg's father talking about her. Bennion said, in response to Thunberg's assertion that people should listen to scientists rather than her, "Whether the Thunbergs like it or not, the world still wants to listen to Greta".

Ben Dowell of The Times praised of the "mesmerising" episode that Thunberg's "determination and quiet intelligence radiate", while her father is "engaging" and "speaks movingly of his parental fears and concerns". Writing for New Scientist, Karina Shah found that the series "presents a more delicate side" of Thunberg. Shah said that it is "difficult to demonstrate the urgency of climate change" but that "by showcasing Thunberg's journey... the evidence presents itself every day". The Observers Euan Ferguson was positively surprised by Thunberg's likeability and amount of knowledge, in contradiction to how critics present her. Hugo Rifkind of The Times wanted the documentary to address why people are attracted to Thunberg's criticism and listen to her, but did not find an answer. Rifkind found the science uninteresting and sad, in contrast to Thunberg.

References

Further reading

External links
Official website

2020s British documentary television series
2021 British television series debuts
2021 British television series endings
Year to Change the World
BBC television documentaries about science
Documentary television series about science
Television series by BBC Studios